Tuula Vilkas (born 18 May 1950) is a Finnish speed skater. She competed at the 1972 Winter Olympics and the 1976 Winter Olympics.

References

External links
 

1950 births
Living people
Finnish female speed skaters
Olympic speed skaters of Finland
Speed skaters at the 1972 Winter Olympics
Speed skaters at the 1976 Winter Olympics
People from Urjala
Sportspeople from Pirkanmaa